Scott Koskie (born December 14, 1971) is a former volleyball player, who played as a setter for the Canada men's national volleyball team. He was an assistant coach for the Canadian Women's national team in Winnipeg, Manitoba.  He was named Best Setter at the 2005 NORCECA Championship in Winnipeg, where Team Canada finished in third place.

Individual awards
 2005 NORCECA Championship "Best Setter"

References
 Profile

1971 births
Living people
Canadian men's volleyball players
Volleyball players from Winnipeg